Nysius raphanus (also known as the false chinch bug) is a small (no more than  inch) North American  insect in the order Hemiptera and family Lygaeidae. They are grey to brown in color, with largely transparent wings, and can release an offensive odor similar to stinkbugs. They have no larval stage, instead going through several nymph stages with the nymphs resembling adults but having no wings. In high numbers false chinch bugs can cause significant plant damage.

References

 Backyard Gardener - False Chinch Bugs, June 6, 2001
 False chinch bugs

External links
 Picture of a false chinch bug
 

raphanus
Hemiptera of North America
Insects described in 1872